The 2010 Coupe de France Final was the 92nd final of France's most prestigious cup competition. The final took place on 1 May 2010 at the Stade de France in the Parisian suburb of Saint-Denis. The cup was won by Paris Saint-Germain with a 1–0 win against Monaco.
A Guillaume Hoarau header in extra time was the difference between the teams.

As winners, PSG were guaranteed a UEFA Europa League place for the 2010–11 season, which they claimed after finishing 13th in Ligue 1, outside the Champions League qualification places. The final was televised on France 2, the cup's main broadcaster.

Team background
Monaco's appearance in the Coupe de France final marked their eighth appearance in the competition's ultimate match. Of the appearances, Monaco have won the cup five times, which is tied for fourth in the cup's history. Monaco's last appearance in the final dates all the way back to the 1990–91 season when they defeated Marseille 1–0 with the lone goal coming from Gerald Passi.

Paris Saint-Germain entered the final for the 11th time in the club's history. Their 11 appearances rank second best behind Marseille in French football history. Of the 11 appearances, PSG has tasted cup victory seven times, second to Marseille's ten titles. Their last victory came during the 2005–06 season when they defeated Marseille 2–1 with the goals coming from Bonaventure Kalou and Vikash Dhorasoo. PSG's last finals appearance came during the 2007–08 season. The club suffered heartbreak losing 1–0 in extra time to Lyon.

In total, Monaco and PSG have contested each other 29 times in league play with the former having the advantage winning 16 matches. PSG have accounted for only three wins, while ten were played to a draw. Monaco and PSG have faced each other five times in the Coupe de France. One of their more important meetings in the competition came during the 1984–85 season when the two met in the competition's ultimate match. In the match – played at PSG's home stadium, the Parc des Princes – Monaco recorded a 1–0 victory with the only goal coming from French international Bernard Genghini. The club's most recent meetings came during the 2009–10 Ligue 1 season. The first match was played on 13 September 2009 at the Stade Louis II. The match ended in a 2–0 victory for Monaco, with Park Chu-young and Nenê scoring the goals. On 20 January 2010, the return match was played in Paris. The match ended 1–0 again, in favour of Monaco, with PSG goalkeeper Apoula Edel scoring an own goal for Monaco in the second half.

Road to the Final

Match background

Ticketing
The Coupe de France final has been played every year at the Stade de France since 1998, following the stadium's completion. The stadium has a capacity of 81,338 spectators. Each club that will participate in the final will receive the same quota of tickets. The tickets were distributed to the public via each club, as well as the each club's league association. Paris Saint-Germain sold their tickets on 17 April at the service area of the Parc des Princes, the club's home stadium. Monaco distributed their tickets to the public four days later on 21 April at the Stade Louis II, the club's home stadium. The Ligue de la Méditerranée de Football, whom Monaco is representing, and the Ligue de Paris Ile-de-France de Football, whom Paris Saint-Germain is representing, only distributed tickets to local clubs within each league. Tickets went on sale to the general public on 26 April. Pricing was defined by category with Category 1 seats, the highest category, being priced at €115 and Category 3, the lowest, going for €55.

Officials
On 15 April, the French Football Federation announced that referee Lionel Jaffredo of Brittany would officiate the 2010 Coupe de France final. His assistants were Frédéric Cano of Centre-Ouest and Christophe Capelli of Aquitaine, with Clément Turpin of Bourgogne serving as the fourth official. Jaffredo refereed three league matches during the season that involved Monaco: a 1–0 defeat to Sochaux, a 1–1 draw with Le Mans and another stalemate with Auxerre. Jaffredo did not referee a match contested by Paris Saint-Germain this season.

Match

Details

References

External links
 Coupe de France Results

Final
2010
Coupe De France Final 2010
Coupe De France Final 2010
Coupe de France Final
Sport in Saint-Denis, Seine-Saint-Denis
Coupe de France Final

fr:Coupe de France de football 2009-2010#Finale